Charlie Chaplin is a 1999 Indian Malayalam film,  directed by P. K. Radhakrishnan. The film stars Prem Kumar, Jagathy Sreekumar, Anju Aravind and Kalpana in the lead roles. The film has art direction by Kalalayam Ravi and musical score by Wilson. It is loosely based on the Tamil film Tata Birla 1996.

Cast

 Prem Kumar as Charlie
 Jagathy Sreekumar as Chaplin 
 Anju Aravind as Nancy Philip
 Kalpana as Chandralekha
 Cochin Haneefa as Albert 
 Harishree Ashokan as Bheeman (Chandralekha's brother)
 Mala Aravindan as Achu, driver 
 A. C. Zainuddin as Photographer 
 Bindu Varappuzha as Vasanthy (Servant)
 Elias Babu as Viswanathan 
 Kuthiravattam Pappu as Uncle 
 Philomina as Aunty

Soundtrack
The music was composed by Wilson and the lyrics were written by Gireesh Puthenchery.

References

External links
 

1999 films
1990s Malayalam-language films